Hokitika is a town in the West Coast region of New Zealand's South Island,  south of Greymouth, and close to the mouth of the Hokitika River. It is the seat and largest town in the Westland District.

On a clear day Aoraki / Mount Cook can clearly be seen from Hokitika's main street.

Toponymy 
According to the Ministry for Culture and Heritage, the name comes from when a band of Ngāi Tahu warriors in search of greenstone were about to attack Ngāti Wairangi . The chief of the invaders drowned while trying to cross the Hokitika River, and the leaderless  (army) then returned directly to their own home.

History
The land where Hokitika stands was purchased in 1860 from Māori when Poutini Ngāi Tahu chiefs signed the Arahura Deed. This was the sale of the whole of the West Coast region, apart from small areas reserved for Māori. It was almost 3 million hectares and sold to the Crown for £300.

Founded on gold mining in 1864, it was a centre of the West Coast Gold Rush and grew very quickly. Members of the Jewish community ran stores and businesses and built a synagogue in Tancred St. One of them, John Lazar, was appointed Town Clerk in 1866 and was a prominent Freemason.

By late 1866, it was one of New Zealand's most populous centres. On 16 September 1867, there were 41 vessels alongside the wharf at Hokitika, in some places three and four deep. In 1867, the port of Hokitika ranked first in New Zealand in both the number of vessels entered inwards and in the total value of exports; principally gold.

On 8 March 1868 a mock funeral was held in protest about the conviction and hanging of three Irish Fenians in Manchester – the Manchester Martyrs. The funeral was led by Roman Catholic Father William Larkin and a Celtic Cross was erected in the Hokitika Cemetery. Larkin was later arrested, charged, and convicted of riot and seditious libel.

In 1873 Hokitika became the capital of the short-lived Westland Province which lasted from 1873 until the abolition of provinces in 1876.

In the early 20th century Hokitika had two hospitals, the Westland Hospital and the Seaview Asylum.

In October 1941, three Hokitika police officers (and a policeman stationed in the neighbouring locality of Kaniere), along with a field instructor for the Canterbury education board, were killed when a local farmer, Stanley Graham, went on a shooting rampage and killed seven people, including two armed Home guard personnel.

In the ensuing manhunt, the biggest in New Zealand history, overseen by the Commissioner of Police, Denis Cummings, more than 100 New Zealand Police and several hundred New Zealand Army & Home Guard searched the area for the gunman for 12 days, with orders to shoot him on sight if found still armed. On 20 October, after being spotted by two police constables and a local civilian carrying his rifle and ammunition belts, Graham was fatally wounded by a police constable and died the next day.

The population has declined greatly since that time but the population of the Westland District is now on the rise thanks to "lifestyle inhabitants". Almost 30% of the district's rate-payers live outside of Hokitika.

Geography

Climate
Hokitika has an oceanic climate, with mild summers, cool winters, and rainfall evenly distributed across the year.

Hokitika Gorge

Nearby Hokitika Gorge is a popular short tourist walk, with vibrant blue water and a "swing" (metal rope suspension) bridge.

Demographics 

Hokitika had a population of 2,892 at the 2018 New Zealand census, a decrease of 75 people (−2.5%) since the 2013 census, and a decrease of 186 people (−6.0%) since the 2006 census. There were 1,305 households. There were 1,374 males and 1,521 females, giving a sex ratio of 0.9 males per female. The median age was 47.5 years (compared with 37.4 years nationally), with 459 people (15.9%) aged under 15 years, 474 (16.4%) aged 15 to 29, 1,278 (44.2%) aged 30 to 64, and 687 (23.8%) aged 65 or older.

Ethnicities were 86.4% European/Pākehā, 20.1% Māori, 1.7% Pacific peoples, 4.9% Asian, and 1.3% other ethnicities (totals add to more than 100% since people could identify with multiple ethnicities).

The proportion of people born overseas was 11.6%, compared with 27.1% nationally.

Although some people objected to giving their religion, 47.7% had no religion, 41.3% were Christian, 0.8% were Hindu, 0.4% were Muslim, 0.3% were Buddhist and 1.8% had other religions.

Of those at least 15 years old, 330 (13.6%) people had a bachelor or higher degree, and 654 (26.9%) people had no formal qualifications. The median income was $27,300, compared with $31,800 nationally. The employment status of those at least 15 was that 1,146 (47.1%) people were employed full-time, 408 (16.8%) were part-time, and 57 (2.3%) were unemployed.

Economy and culture
The major industries of greenstone (pounamu), gold, coal, and forestry have all dwindled over the last century, but a growing ecotourism industry has grown up and the town is starting to show signs of recovery. It has become a major tourist stop on the West Coast's main highway route, with carving of greenstone an important local industry. It is also gaining a reputation for its annual wild food festival which has been running since 1990.

Seaview Asylum was once the town's biggest employer.

Another important industry is dairying, with Westland Milk Products having its headquarters and main processing plant in the town. Westland Milk Products was established as a dairy co-operative in 1937, and was sold to the Yili Group in 2019. It is the country's third-equal largest dairy processor as of 2018.

Hokitika has a 3D digital cinema, the Regent Theatre, due to volunteer hours and grants from the Lions foundation, Lottery's commission, Development West Coast through the Major District Initiative and pub charity. The Art Deco theatre is a heritage building and narrowly avoided being demolished, thanks to a last-minute coup in the management committee. Community performances are also held there. Hokitika has a drama group which produce plays. It is also on the circuit for Arts on Tour and well known artists from many countries as well as New Zealand perform at the Old Lodge Theatre.

Every January, Hokitika beach hosts the Driftwood and Sand Festival. The festival involves members of the public and a sponsored artist constructing sculptures out of beach debris. Driftwood and Sand originated in  beach festival run by Hokitika artist Donald Buglass in November 2002, and it has been run as an annual festival since 2003.

The Hokitika Museum is housed in the town's Carnegie library building. The Hokitika Sock Machine Museum in Revell Street has on display a collection of antique sock-knitting machines. Visitors are invited to knit their own socks. Hokitika also has a modern library, thriving community groups, and many excellent artists.

Marae
Arahura Marae is located near Hokitika. It is a marae (tribal meeting ground) of Ngāi Tahu and its Te Rūnanga o Ngāti Waewae branch, and includes the Tūhuru wharenui (meeting house).

In October 2020, the Government committed $161,131 from the Provincial Growth Fund to upgrade the marae, and create four jobs.

Transport

Road
 passes through the town.

Rail
The first rail transport was the Hokitika & Kanieri Tramway laid with wooden rails was established in 1868, with cars drawn by horses. A road followed in 1873.

A branch line railway known as the Hokitika Branch was established to the town from Greymouth in 1893, and an extension to Ross was open from 1909 to 1980.

Passengers to Hokitika were initially served by mixed trains that carried both goods and passengers. In 1936, these services were augmented by a Leyland diesel railbus service that ran from Hokitika to Greymouth, Christchurch, and briefly Reefton. In the early 1940s, the Vulcan railcars were introduced and they provided a twice-daily service between Ross and Christchurch via Hokitika. The mixed trains continued to operate until 1967, and all passenger services to Hokitika ceased when the Vulcan railcars stopped running past Greymouth in 1972. 

Since then, the line to Hokitika has been freight only with traffic primarily coming from Westland Milk Products.

Shipping

In 1865, after the discovery of gold in the area, the town became the official port of entry of the West Coast. A boom period ensued when Hokitika was second only to Auckland, with reports of over 40 ships in the harbour at one time, with more waiting offshore. It was a dangerous port, with 108 strandings and 32 ships lost from 1865 to 1867. The lack of nearby coal meant that the port declined rapidly along with the gold, though Hokitika remained an official entry port until the 1950s.

Air

Air New Zealand provides two flights a day to Christchurch. The Hokitika Airport is adjacent to the town, immediately to the north-east in the suburb of Seaview.

Hokitika's Southside airfield was the base of Air Travel, New Zealand's first airline. Air Travel carried passengers, mail and freight south from Hokitika to the glaciers and remote landing strips beyond Haast and north up to Westport. Its first scheduled flight was in December 1934. Directors were Hokitika residents: Bert Mercer, Paul Renton and Harry Newman.

After the second world war, Air Travel was nationalised and became part of NAC.

Education
A school was described as "recently opened" in Hokitika in 1875, and had nearly 350 students. The Hokitika District High School provided both primary and secondary education for the area for many years.

It is a state integrated Catholic school and is connected with St Mary's Catholic Church.

All these schools are coeducational. Rolls are as of

Notable people 

 Agnes Addison (c.1842–1903), Scottish draper who was one of Hokitika's early businesswomen.
 Margaret Andrews Alcorn (1868–1967) and her sister Mary Alcorn (1866–1928) were interior designers and business owners
 Charles Button (1838–1920), mayor of Hokitika, solicitor, judge, and MP
 John Urquhart Cropp (1927–2016), Olympic yachtsman
 Edward St John Daniel (1837–1868), Victoria Cross recipient, died and is buried in Hokitika
 Charlie Douglas (1840–1916), explorer and surveyor
 Alice Eyton (1874–1929), journalist, screenwriter, playwright, and novelist in Hollywood
 Stanley Graham (1900–1941), a farmer who killed seven people and was the target of New Zealand's biggest manhunt
 Bess Hudson (1875–1961), early nurse, for Dr Teichelmann
 Al Hunter (born 1950), musician, singer-songwriter
 John Lazar (1840–1916), actor, town clerk, mason
 Sharlotte Lucas (born 1991), road cyclist
 Fayne Robinson (born 1964), Māori carver
 Holly Robinson (born 1994), athlete born in Hokitika
 John Rutherford Ryley (1837–1884), who introduced antiseptic technique to New Zealand, was surgeon at Hokitika Hospital at the time
 Richard Seddon (1845–1906), New Zealand politician and Premier
 Ebenezer Teichelmann (1859–1938), surgeon, mountaineer, photographer and conservationist

Notable buildings 
 Hokitika Customhouse, built 1897, a Category I historic place
 The Hokitika Clock Tower, built 1902/3, the most prominent landmark in Hokitika
 Hokitika Museum, housed in the former Carnegie Library, built 1908
 Seaview Asylum, founded 1872 and once the town's biggest employer
 All Saints' Church, a prominent landmark and early unfaced concrete church
 St Andrew's United Church, built in 1935, a good example of a small Gothic parish church
 Renton Hardware building (also known as the Okitiki building), completed in 1908, a Category 2 historic place
 Government Buildings (also known as Seddon House), completed in 1913, a Category 1 historic place
 St Mary's Catholic Church, a Category 1 historic place
 Hokitika Savings Bank building, a Category 2 historic place

Sister cities
Hokitika has one sister city.
  Deloraine, Australia

In popular culture
The events of The Luminaries, by Eleanor Catton, take place within Hokitika. The book won the Man Booker Prize in 2013.

The novel Hokitika Town, by Charlotte Randall, is set in Hokitika.

The 2004 historical novel The Colour by Rose Tremain is partially set in 1860s Hokitika.

The 1999 movie Magik and Rose was set in Hokitika.

See also
 Mayor of Hokitika

References

External links

 Hokitika tourism website
 Hokitika Wild Food Festival
 Westland Milk Products
 Westland High School

 
Westland District
Former provincial capitals of New Zealand
Populated places in the West Coast, New Zealand